Lafoga Jordan Mailata (born 31 March 1997) is an Australian professional American football offensive tackle for the Philadelphia Eagles of the National Football League (NFL). He previously played rugby league for the Canterbury-Bankstown Bulldogs under-18s team and the South Sydney Rabbitohs on their under-20s team. He joined the NFL via the league's International Player Pathway Program and was selected in the 7th round, 233rd overall by the Philadelphia Eagles in the 2018 NFL Draft.

Rugby league career 
Jordan Mailata grew up playing rugby league for the Bankstown Bulls, and was selected for the Canterbury-Bankstown Bulldogs' Under 18s team in 2015. The Canterbury-Bankstown Bulldogs are a professional rugby league side founded in 1934, and participate in the National Rugby League (NRL) in Australia. In 2014, Mailata fainted during a pre-season training session, one week before the Bulldog's first scheduled game in the S.G. Ball Cup. The S.G. Ball Cup is an Under-18s rugby league football competition which is hosted in New South Wales. This required surgery to repair both the upper and lower chambers of his heart. He went on hiatus from rugby league for over a year. During this time, it was reported that Mailata had jumped from 147 kilograms to 166 kilograms. After coming back from surgery, Mailata and his two brothers Daniel and Moana played rugby league for Five Dock RSL Junior Rugby League in Five Dock, at the A-grade level in the Balmain competition. It was in this competition that Mailata attracted the attention of Ben Rogers, a recruitment agent for the South Sydney Rabbitohs.

Mailata was then offered the opportunity to join the South Sydney Rabbitohs' U20s team in 2017. The South Sydney Rabbitohs offered Mailata a one-year contract worth $5000 to play for the North Sydney Bears. The North Sydney Bears had a partnership with the South Sydney Rabbitohs in which they served as the Rabbitohs reserve grade team. This partnership was intact from 2007 until 2018, when the agreement ended. It has been stated that Mailata was only offered a reserve-grade contract due to fitness and conditioning concerns. The South Sydney coaching staff did not believe that Mailata would be able to physically keep up with the pace and nature of professional rugby league, due to the free-flowing play and limited stoppages in games. Mailata was given the advice from his agency to "play a sport that appreciates his size". Ultimately, Mailata declined the contract from the South Sydney Rabbitohs. There was no bad sentiment between Mailata and the Rabbitohs after the contract offer, as Mailata stated "They gave me a chance. Without them, I wouldn't be here".

NFL career 

After seeing video clips of him playing rugby league, NFL executives invited Mailata to try out for their International Player Pathway Program. Mailata had never played American football and admitted that his knowledge of the game was minimal, and also stated that he would watch only one NFL game a year, the Super Bowl. When asked what position he wanted to play, he suggested offensive tackle, since he knew of that position from the movie The Blind Side. In February 2018, he went to IMG Academy in Florida to train under the supervision and guidance of coach Aden Durde. During this training he was scouted by Jeff Stoutland, the offensive line coach of the Philadelphia Eagles. During the player introductions for NBC Sunday Night Football, Mailata pays credit to Stoutland's mentorship, saying he attended "Jeff Stoutland University", having had no collegiate football experience before entering the NFL.

NFL scouts evaluated Mailata as a 5.5 prospect grade, which equates to a practice-squad player with a chance to make the bottom-end of the official NFL roster. Pre-draft scouting reports written about Mailata evaluated him as a "work in progress", and gave him the pro player comparison of Conor McDermott of the New York Jets.

In March 2018, Mailata attended a combine at the Tampa Bay Buccaneers practice facility, at One Buc Place. The combine participants included 5 other international NFL prospects like Mailata, as well as a host of top-ranked college football prospects who did not receive an invite to the official NFL Combine. Several general managers of NFL teams were present, including Jason Licht of the Tampa Bay Buccaneers and Rick Spielman of the Minnesota Vikings.

Mailata received doubts from scouts through the NFL drafting process and combine, as his weaknesses were listed as "will require an extensive period of development to learn technique", and "has never played a single down of American football". However, scouts did see positives in Mailata as they described him to have "very good physical traits" and "a tremendous size with a frame that carries weight well" due to his 6-foot-8 stature.  IMG Academy strength and conditioning trainer Jay Butler stated that he had "never had anybody that looks like that" in reference to Mailata's sub-20% body fat percentage and physical attributes. Mailata was also extremely quick for his frame, as he recorded a 5.12 second time in the 40-yard dash at the combine, which was the 7th best time recorded for tackles at the NFL combine in February 2018. Mailata also managed to record a 4.67 second time for the short shuttle, which would have equated to a top-10 score amongst left tackles at the official NFL combine. Additionally, Mailata was able to achieve 22 reps at the combine bench press. In response to his own performance, Mailata felt optimistic as he hoped that coaches would get "a chance to see the progress I have made as I try to master the position."

Philadelphia Eagles 
Mailata was selected by the Philadelphia Eagles with the 233rd overall pick in the seventh round of the 2018 NFL Draft. Mailata became the second player to be drafted with no American high school or college experience after German Moritz Böhringer, following the path of compatriot Jarryd Hayne, who also converted from rugby league. Mailata signed a four-year deal worth USD$2.5 million with a signing bonus of $89,392.

Mailata said that the biggest mental hurdle when transitioning from rugby league to the NFL was the extensive playbook. He stated that when he first started training camp with the Philadelphia Eagles, he was handed a playbook and that it felt like "a different language." On 1 September 2018, Mailata made the initial 53-man roster for the Eagles. On 14 December 2018, Mailata was placed on injured reserve after sustaining a back injury categorised as a stress fracture, which ended his rookie season before appearing in any games.

After missing the first two games of the 2019 season with a back injury, Mailata was placed on injured reserve again on 21 September 2019.

Mailata was placed on the reserve/COVID-19 list by the Eagles on 29 July 2020. He was activated from the list on 13 August 2020. On 13 September, Mailata made his NFL debut against the Washington Football Team, replacing injured rookie Jack Driscoll in the third quarter. Mailata made his first start for the Philadelphia Eagles in week 4 of the 2020 season against the San Francisco 49ers, due to an injury to Jason Peters. On 1 November 2020, against the Cowboys, Mailata sustained a concussion from a helmet-to-helmet hit from Jaylon Smith. On 2 January 2021, Mailata was deemed unable to play against the Washington Football Team due to the concussion, ending Mailata's season with 15 appearances and 10 starts for the Eagles. Mailata ended the 2020 season as a top-15 offensive tackle in the NFL from week 11, as graded by Pro Football Focus. Over the course of the 2020 season, Mailata led the Eagles in fewest sacks allowed amongst offensive linemen, allowing just 7. Mailata also led Eagles offensive linemen in pass pro snaps with 502, equating to a pass pro snaps per sack score of 71.7, which was third best on the Eagles behind Lane Johnson and Jack Driscoll.

On 31 August 2021, Eagles head coach Nick Sirianni named Mailata the starter at left tackle for the 2021 NFL season. On 11 September 2021, Mailata signed a four-year, USD$64 million contract including $40.85 million guaranteed.

On 21 December 2022, Mailata was named an NFC Pro Bowl alternate. Mailata helped the Eagles reach Super Bowl LVII where they lost to the Kansas City Chiefs 38-35.

His success has seen him frequently described by the media as a human "wrecking ball".

Music
Since joining the Eagles, Mailata has been noted for his singing ability. In 2022, Mailata competed in season 7 of The Masked Singer as "Thingamabob" of Team Cuddly. He was eliminated alongside Jorge Garcia as "Cyclops" of Team Bad. During the 2022 offseason, he recorded a Christmas album titled A Philly Special Christmas along with teammates Jason Kelce, Lane Johnson, and former Eagles linebacker Connor Barwin.

Personal life 
Jordan Mailata is the son of Samoan immigrants to Australia. Mailata was born in Bankstown, Sydney, an LGA which is characterised by its high concentration of Samoan immigrants. When Mailata was born, his sister gave him the middle name Jordan after the basketball superstar Michael Jordan. Playing rugby league was always a strong part of the Mailata family traditions, as Mailata's three brothers Daniel, Moana and Millo all played Rugby League. Mailata has three brothers and one sister, as well as a niece named Eraia.

Mailata has lived away from Sydney since 2018, and says that the things he misses the most about home are his friends and family, as well as simple Australian comfort foods such as meat pies and sausage rolls. In the same interview, Mailata revealed that his favourite movies are the Star Wars and the Lord of the Rings series, and that his favourite band is Bon Jovi.

Mailata is sponsored by Australian clothing company Johnny Bigg, which specialises in clothes for people with larger frames.

Mailata graduated at Condell Park High School.

See also
 List of players who have converted from one football code to another

References

External links
 Philadelphia Eagles bio

1997 births
Living people
American football offensive tackles
Australian sportspeople of Samoan descent
Australian players of American football
Australian rugby league players
Philadelphia Eagles players
Sportsmen from New South Wales
Sportspeople from Sydney
Footballers who switched code
International Player Pathway Program participants
Australian expatriate sportspeople in the United States
Expatriate players of American football